Casa Diablo Hot Springs is a hot springs and active geothermal location, near Mammoth Lakes and the Eastern Sierra Nevada, in Mono County, eastern California.

Geography
It is within the northern part of the Long Valley Caldera volcanic feature and zone, and beside U.S. Highway 395.  California State Route 203 branches off to the west from the Highway 395 interchange at Casa Diablo Hot Springs, leading to the Mammoth Lakes and ski resort area, and Devils Postpile National Monument.

History
Casa Diablo Hot Springs was once the site of a regularly erupting geyser.  It was an obsidian mine for Native Americans.  Casa Diablo was a stagecoach station from 1878 to 1881.  A tourist stop was built here in the 1920s, including an 'Indian Trading Post' and service station alongside old Highway 395.

Geothermal power
The Mammoth Geothermal Complex is located here, owned by Ormat and operated by Mammoth Pacific, LP.

See also

Long Valley Observatory — USGS volcano observatory
Hot Creek (Mono County, California)
Mono Basin National Scenic Area

References

Hot springs of California
Geothermal power stations in California
Hot springs of Mono County, California
Inyo National Forest